The Wool Industries Research Association was an industrial research organization in the United Kingdom. It later became the Wira Technology Group before being merged with the Shirley Institute in the 1989 to form the British Textile Technology Group.
It was funded by a levy raised under powers from the Industrial Organisation and Development Act 1947 through the Wool Textile Research Council, established in 1950.

Notable employees
 Richard Laurence Millington Synge
 Jim Marshall (UK politician)
 David Cox (statistician)
 Archer J.P. Martin

Martin and Synge
Archer J.P. Martin and Richard L.M. Synge worked together at the Wool Industries Research Association in Leeds. In 1941 they published a paper entitled ‘A New Form of Chromatogram Employing Two Liquid Phases’ in the Biochemical Journal. Martin and Synge described how they had used columns of silica with water, used as the stationary phase, whilst a second, non-miscible liquid, flowed down the column. The second liquid was the organic solvent chloroform, and they separated acetamino-acids from protein hydrolysates. The components of the mixture separated were distributed between the two phases, depending on their relative affinity for each of the phases. As the components spread, they became separated from each other, and could be collected as they left the column. This is how ‘partition chromatography’ came to be known as a new form of chromatography due to the way that the sample ‘partitioned’ itself between the two liquid phases. Their paper was important because it laid the foundations of all the future work in the field of chromatography. In the first part of the paper they presented the first ever theory of chromatography that attempted to explain the concentration of the solute at any point in the column and also how the resolution of the column was affected by various factors including the column's length. Looking at the figures they present for resolution in terms of Height Equivalent to a Theoretical Plate (HETP), underlying the importance of their work at that time. The HETP is a measure of the resolution that can be obtained by the column. There are several factors that affect HETP.

References

Research institutes in the United Kingdom
Woollen industry
Textile industry of the United Kingdom
Textile organizations